Asphondylia rudbeckiaeconspicua is a species of gall midges in the family Cecidomyiidae. The larvae induce galls on Rudbeckia laciniata in North America. It was first described by Carl Robert Osten-Sacken in 1878.

References

Cecidomyiinae
Articles created by Qbugbot
Insects described in 1878

Gall-inducing insects
Taxa named by Carl Robert Osten-Sacken
Diptera of North America